The Lamnidae are the family of mackerel sharks known as white sharks. They are large, fast-swimming predatory fish found in oceans worldwide, though prefer environments with colder water. The name of the family is formed from the Greek word lamna, which means "fish of prey", and was derived from the Greek legendary creature, the Lamia.

These sharks have pointed snouts, spindle-shaped bodies, and large gill openings. The first dorsal fin is large, high, stiff and angular or somewhat rounded.  The second dorsal and anal fins are minute.  The caudal peduncle has a couple of less distinct keels.  The teeth are gigantic.  The fifth gill opening is in front of the pectoral fin and spiracles are sometimes absent. They are powerful, heavily built sharks, sometimes weighing nearly twice as much as other sharks of comparable length from other families. Many sharks in the family are among the fastest-swimming fish, although the massive great white shark is slower due to its large size.

Genera and species
The family contains five living species in three genera and these selected extinct genera and species:
 Genus †Carchariolamna Hora, 1939
†Carchariolamna heroni Hora, 1939
 Genus Carcharodon Smith, 1838
 Carcharodon carcharias (Linnaeus, 1758) (great white shark)
†Carcharodon caifassii Lawley, 1876
†Carcharodon hubbelli Ehret, Macfadden, Jones, Devries, Foster & Salas-Gismondi, 2012 (Hubbell's white shark)
 Genus †Corax Agassiz 1843
 Genus †Cosmopolitodus Glikman, 1964
†Cosmopolitodus hastalis Agassiz, 1843 (broad-toothed mako)
 Genus †Carcharomodus
†Carcharomodus escheri Agassiz, 1843
 Genus Isurus Rafinesque, 1810
 Isurus oxyrinchus Rafinesque, 1810 (shortfin mako)
 Isurus paucus Guitart-Manday, 1966 (longfin mako)
†Isurus desori Agassiz, 1843
†Isurus flandricus Leriche, 1910
†Isurus minutus Agassiz, 1843
†Isurus nakaminatoensis Saito, 1961
†Isurus planus Agassiz, 1856
†Isurus praecursor Leriche, 1905
†Isurus rameshi Mehrotra, Mishra & Srivastava, 1973
 Genus †Isurolamna Cappetta, 1976
†Isurolamna affinis Casier, 1946
†Isurolamna bajarunasi Glikman & Zhelezko, 1985
†Isurolamna gracilis Le Hon, 1871
†Isurolamna inflata Leriche, 1905
 Genus †Karaisurus Kozlov in Zhelezko & Kozlov, 1999
†Karaisurus demidkini Kozlov in Zhelezko & Kozlov, 1999
 Genus †Lamiostoma Glikman, 1964
†Lamiostoma belyaevi Glikman, 1964
†Lamiostoma stolarovi Glikman & Zhelezko in Zhelezko & Kozlov, 1999
 Genus Lamna Cuvier, 1816
 Lamna ditropis Hubbs & Follett, 1947 (salmon shark)
 Lamna nasus Bonnaterre, 1788 (porbeagle)
†Lamna attenuata Davis, 1888
†Lamna carinata Davis, 1888
†Lamna hectori Davis, 1888
†Lamna marginalis Davis, 1888
†Lamna quinquelateralis Cragin, 1894
†Lamna trigeri Coquand, 1860
†Lamna trigonata Agassiz, 1843
 Genus †Lethenia Leriche, 1910
†Lethenia vandenbroecki Winkler, 1880
 Genus †Macrorhizodus Glikman, 1964
†Macrorhizodus americanus Leriche, 1942
†Macrorhizodus nolfi Zhelezko, 1999

See also

 List of sharks
 Shark
 List of prehistoric cartilaginous fish

References

 

 
Extant Late Cretaceous first appearances
Ovoviviparous fish
Shark families
Taxa named by Friedrich Gustav Jakob Henle
Taxa named by Johannes Peter Müller